Ngoufack Mélé Temguia (born 1 August 1995) is a German footballer who plays as a centre-back for Forward Madison FC in USL League One.

Early life
Temguia was born in Darmstadt, Germany before moving to Montreal, Quebec as a child. He played youth football with Sherbrooke-based club Verts de Sherbrooke until 2011, when he joined the academy of professional club Montreal Impact.

Club career

FC Montreal
After spending four years with the Montreal Impact Academy, Temguia joined the club's new reserve side, FC Montreal, in the USL.  He made his professional debut on 11 April 2015 in a 3–0 defeat to the Rochester Rhinos.

FC Cincinnati
In March 2017, FC Cincinnati announced that they had signed Temguia for the 2017 USL season. Following the end of the season, the club announced that Temguia's contract had expired and would not be renewed.

Hume City
In April 2018, Temguia signed with Australian NPL Victoria side Hume City FC, joining former FC Montreal teammate Zachary Sukunda. He made eleven appearances and scored one goal before leaving Hume mid-season.

Valentine Phoenix
On 19 June 2018, Temguia signed with NPL Northern New South Wales side Valentine Phoenix FC. He made nine appearances for Valentine that season.

FC Edmonton
On 26 February 2019, Temguia signed with Canadian Premier League club FC Edmonton. In his debut on 4 May 2019, Temguia scored the club's first goal in the Canadian Premier League in a 2–1 win over Valour FC. That season, he made 27 league appearances, scoring two goals, and made another two appearances in the Canadian Championship. On 27 November 2019, Temguia re-signed with Edmonton for the 2020 season. On 9 February 2022, the club announced that Temguia and all but two other players would not be returning for the 2022 season.

Forward Madison FC
On 4 March 2022, it was announced that Temguia signed with USL League One club Forward Madison FC.

References

External links
 
 
 USL profile
 USSF Development League bio

1995 births
Living people
Association football defenders
Canadian soccer players
German footballers
Footballers from Hesse
Sportspeople from Darmstadt
Black Canadian soccer players
Canadian expatriate soccer players
German expatriate footballers
Expatriate soccer players in the United States
Canadian expatriate sportspeople in the United States
German expatriate sportspeople in the United States
Expatriate soccer players in Australia
Canadian expatriate sportspeople in Australia
German expatriate sportspeople in Australia
Montreal Impact U23 players
FC Montreal players
FC Cincinnati (2016–18) players
Hume City FC players
Valentine Phoenix FC players
FC Edmonton players
Canadian Soccer League (1998–present) players
USL Championship players
National Premier Leagues players
Canadian Premier League players
Forward Madison FC players